

The following is a complete list of the 220 Our Gang short films produced by Hal Roach Studios and/or Metro-Goldwyn-Mayer between 1922 and 1944, numbered by order of release along with production order.

1922 - 1923 - 1924 - 1925 - 1926 - 1927 - 1928 - 1929 - 1930 - 1931  1932 - 1933 - 1934 - 1935 - 1936 - 1937 - 1938 - 1939 - 1940 - 1941 - 1942 - 1943 - 1944

The Roach/Pathé silents (1922–1928) 
These two-reel silent Our Gang shorts were produced by Hal Roach Studios and distributed to theaters by Pathé.

The Roach/MGM silents (1927–1929) 
These silent Our Gang shorts were produced by Hal Roach Studios and distributed to theaters by Metro-Goldwyn-Mayer. All films are two reels (20 minutes) long, except Spook Spoofing, which is three reels (30 minutes) long. Shorts marked with an asterisk (*) were originally released with a synchronized music and sound effects track.

The Roach/MGM talkies (1929–1938, The Little Rascals) 
These sound Our Gang shorts were produced by Hal Roach Studios and distributed to theaters by Metro-Goldwyn-Mayer. These 80 films, excepting some that have been removed for content, are the Our Gang shorts that King World Productions have packaged and syndicated as The Little Rascals.

All shorts through Arbor Day in 1936 are two reels (approximately 17 to 20 minutes) long except Small Talk, which is three reels (26 minutes) long. Subsequent shorts (1936's Bored of Education through 1938's Hide and Shriek) are one reel (10 minutes) in length, except for Our Gang Follies of 1938, a one-shot return to the two-reel format. Also in 1936, an Our Gang feature-length film, General Spanky, was released.

Many of the shorts were edited for television over the years, and distributor King World Productions removed several of the shorts from their Little Rascals television package. Shorts that were either edited for, or withheld from, television broadcast are noted as such.

The MGM talkies (1938–1944) 
These one-reel sound Our Gang shorts were produced and distributed by Metro-Goldwyn-Mayer.

Foreign-language versions 
During the early days of sound American motion picture companies often made foreign-language versions of their films. The following is a list of known foreign-language versions of Our Gang films.

Cameos/appearances in other films 
Our Gang as a unit appeared in a handful of other Hal Roach films, and in a few outside productions as well.
 Dr. Jack (November 26, 1922) - a Hal Roach feature-length comedy starring Harold Lloyd. Jackie Condon and Mickey Daniels both appear.
 Safety Last! (April 1, 1923) - a Hal Roach feature-length comedy starring Harold Lloyd. Mickey Daniels appears.
 The Fraidy Cat (March 30, 1924) - a Hal Roach short comedy starring Charley Chase. Our Gang players featured are Joe Cobb, Mickey Daniels, Ernie "Sunshine Sammy" Morrison, and Andy Samuel.
 Girl Shy (April 20, 1924) - a feature-length comedy starring Harold Lloyd. Joe Cobb and Jackie Condon both appear.
 Rupert of Hee Haw (June 8, 1924) - a Hal Roach short comedy starring Stan Laurel. Our Gang players featured are Joe Cobb, Jackie Condon, Mickey Daniels, Mary Kornman, and Ernie "Sunshine Sammy" Morrison.
 Short Kilts (August 3, 1924) - a Hal Roach short comedy starring Stan Laurel. Our Gang players featured are Mickey Daniels and Mary Kornman.
 Battling Orioles (October 6, 1924) - a Hal Roach feature film starring Glenn Tryon. Our Gang players featured are Joe Cobb, Jackie Condon, Mickey Daniels, and Ernie "Sunshine Sammy" Morrison.
 Pathé Review (November 8, 1925) - Joe Cobb, Jackie Condon, Mickey Daniels, Johnny Downs, "Farina" Hoskins, Mary Kornman, and director Robert F. McGowan appear in a segment.
 45 Minutes from Hollywood (December 26, 1926) - a Hal Roach short comedy starring Glenn Tryon. Features stock footage from Our Gang'''s Thundering Fleas.
 The Stolen Jools (April 4, 1931) (a.k.a. The Slippery Pearls) - promotional short subject intended to raise funds for the National Variety Artists tuberculosis sanitarium. Our Gang players featured are "Stymie" Beard, "Chubby" Chaney, Dorothy DeBorba, "Farina" Hoskins, "Wheezer" Hutchins, Mary Ann Jackson, Shirley Jean Rickert, and Pete the Pup.
 One Track Minds (May 20, 1933) - a Hal Roach short comedy starring Zasu Pitts and Thelma Todd. "Spanky" McFarland is featured.
 The Cracked Iceman (January 27, 1934) - a Hal Roach Charley Chase short subject, featuring Chase as a schoolteacher and the Our Gang kids as his students. Our Gang players featured are "Stymie" Beard, Tommy Bond, and "Spanky" McFarland.
 Four Parts (March 17, 1934) - a Hal Roach Charley Chase short subject. "Stymie" Beard is featured.
 I'll Take Vanilla (May 5, 1934) - a Hal Roach Charley Chase short subject. Tommy Bond is featured.
 Benny From Panama (May 26, 1934) - a Hal Roach short comedy starring Eddie Foy, Jr. "Spanky" McFarland costars.
 Kid Millions (November 10, 1934) - an Eddie Cantor musical feature. The Our Gang kids appear in bit parts among the children in Cantor's makeshift band and also appear in the Technicolor fantasy sequence finale. Our Gang players featured include Wally Albright, "Stymie" Beard, Tommy Bond, "Uh-huh" Collum, Leonard Kibrick, and Jacqueline Taylor.
 Kentucky Kernels (November 2, 1934) - a feature-length comedy starring Bert Wheeler and Robert Woolsey, and costarring "Spanky" McFarland.
 Babes in Toyland (December 16, 1934) - a Hal Roach feature-length comedy starring Stan Laurel and Oliver Hardy. Several Our Gang members appear as schoolkids, including Scotty Beckett, Marianne Edwards, Jacqueline Taylor, and Jerry Tucker. Jean Darling and Johnny Downs also appear, respectively playing Curly Locks and Little Boy Blue.
 Southern Exposure (April 6, 1935) - a Hal Roach Charley Chase short subject. "Alfalfa" Switzer makes a cameo appearance.
 Here Comes the Band (August 30, 1935) - a musical comedy feature starring Ted Lewis, and costarring "Spanky" McFarland.
 Annie Oakley (November 15, 1935) - a George Stevens film. Jerry Tucker costars.
 Life Hesitates at 40 (November 18, 1935) - a Hal Roach Charley Chase short subject. "Alfalfa" Switzer makes a cameo appearance.
 The Bohemian Girl (February 14, 1936) - a Hal Roach feature-length comedy starring Stan Laurel and Oliver Hardy. Darla Hood costars.
 Neighborhood House (May 9, 1936) - a Hal Roach Charley Chase short subject. Darla Hood costars.
 Kelly the Second (August 21, 1936) - a Hal Roach feature-length comedy starring Patsy Kelly and Charley Chase. "Alfalfa" Switzer makes a cameo appearance.
 Block-Heads (August 19, 1938) - a Hal Roach feature-length comedy starring Stan Laurel and Oliver Hardy. Tommy "Butch" Bond makes a cameo appearance.
 The Singing Lesson (1941) - a soundie starring "Alfalfa" Switzer.
 Johnny Doughboy (December 31, 1942) - a feature film starring Jane Withers. George "Spanky" McFarland and Carl "Alfalfa" Switzer are also featured.
 It's a Wonderful Life (December 20, 1946) - a Frank Capra feature film starring Jimmy Stewart. Carl "Alfalfa" Switzer makes a cameo appearance.
 State of the Union (April 30, 1948) - a Frank Capra feature film starring Spencer Tracy. Carl "Alfalfa" Switzer makes a cameo appearance.

 Our Gang related films 
 The Boy Friends (September 13, 1930 through June 18, 1932), a Hal Roach produced short comedy series considered by some to be a spin-off of Our Gang. Former Our Gang stars Mickey Daniels and Mary Kornman were among the series' stars. One Boy Friends short, Too Many Women, featured a direct reference to Our Gang - flashback footage of Mickey and Mary as children.
 General Spanky (December 11, 1936), a feature film produced by Hal Roach and directed by Fred Newmeyer and Gordon Douglas; a Metro-Goldwyn-Mayer release. Starring George "Spanky" McFarland, Phillips Holmes, Billie "Buckwheat" Thomas, Rosina Lawrence, and Carl "Alfalfa" Switzer, General Spanky was intended as a test film to move Our Gang into features, but did not perform to Hal Roach's and MGM's expectations at the box office.
 The Gas House Kids (October 9, 1946 through August 23, 1947), a series of B Movies loosely based on the then-popular East Side Kids/The Bowery Boys comedies. Produced by Producers Releasing Corporation. Three films, Gas House Kids, Gas House Kids Go West, and Gas House Kids in Hollywood were made. Carl Switzer reprised his "Alfalfa" character in two of these films. Tommy Bond was also featured in the cast.
 Curley (August 23, 1947) and Who Killed Doc Robbin (April 9, 1948), two Streamliners produced by Hal Roach and Robert F. McGowan and directed by Bernard Carr with a similar cast and tone as the Our Gang comedies. Both films starred Larry Olsen, Billy Gray, and Matthew "Stymie" Beard's brother Renee Beard. Roach forfeited his option to buy back the rights to the Our Gang trademark to produce these films.
 The Little Rascals Varieties (May 5, 1959), a feature-length compilation featuring clips from Our Gang Follies of 1936, The Pinch Singer, Reunion in Rhythm, and Our Gang Follies of 1938.
 The Little Rascals (August 5, 1994), a feature-length adaptation of Our Gang which includes gags and situations borrowed directly from several of the original shorts. Directed by Penelope Spheeris and starring Travis Tedford as Spanky, Bug Hall as Alfalfa, Brittany Ashton Holmes as Darla, and Ross Bagley as Buckwheat, The Little Rascals was produced by Steven Spielberg's Amblin Entertainment and released by Universal Pictures.
 The Little Rascals Save the Day (April 1, 2014), a direct-to-video Our Gang feature-length adaptation in much the same format as the 1994 film. Directed by Alex Zamm and starring Jet Jurgensmeyer as Spanky, Drew Justice as Alfalfa, Eden Wood as Darla, and Isaiah "Zay Zay" Fredericks as Buckwheat, The Little Rascals was produced by Capital Arts Entertainment and released by Universal Studios Home Entertainment.

 Our Gang related television productions 
 The Little Rascals Christmas Special (December 3, 1979), a thirty-minute animated television special featuring Philip Tanzini as Spanky, Jimmy Gatherum as Alfalfa, Randi Kiger as Darla, Robby Kiger as Porky, and Al Jocko Fann as Stymie. Darla Hood and Matthew "Stymie" Beard are also featured.
 Rascal Dazzle (1980), a compilation film featuring clips from various Roach produced films. Narrated by Jerry Lewis.
 The Little Rascals (September 25, 1982 through September 1, 1984), a Saturday morning cartoon produced by Hanna-Barbera Productions, featuring the voices of Scott Menville as Spanky, Julie McWhirter Dees as Alfalfa and Porky, Shavar Ross as Buckwheat, Patty Maloney as Darla, and Peter Cullen as Pete the Pup.

 Home media 

 Blackhawk/Republic releases 
For many years, Blackhawk Films released 79 of the 80 Roach talkies on 16 mm film. The sound discs for Railroading'  had been lost since the 1940s, and a silent print was made available for home movie release until 1982, when the film's sound discs were located in the MGM vault and the short was restored with sound. Like the television prints, Blackhawk's Little Rascals reissues featured custom-created title cards in place of the original Our Gang logos, as per MGM's 1949 arrangement with Hal Roach not to distribute the series under its original title.

In 1983, with the VHS home video market growing, Blackhawk began distributing Little Rascals VHS tapes available through catalogue only. The 80 sound shorts were made available across twenty-seven VHS volumes (one volume had the MGM short Waldo's Last Stand which was public domain to round out to 81), three shorts to a tape. Half a dozen silent episodes were also available across three additional VHS volumes. Four volumes on VHS went out of print by 1986, then leaving only 69 out of 80 episodes available.

National Telefilm Associates, later renamed Republic Pictures, purchased Blackhawk in 1983, and continued the catalogue releases while also making The Little Rascals available on retail home video collections in 1984. 30 Little Rascals shorts were released in a set of five VHS compilations, with six shorts to a volume: Little Rascals Comedy Classics 1, Little Rascals Comedy Classics 2, Best of the Little Rascals, Little Rascals on Parade, and Adventures of Little Rascals. Each of these tapes contained two volumes of the 1983 catalogue releases, making each tape contain six episodes. In addition, Republic made the first two catalogue volumes available for retail.

Twelve Little Rascals shorts made their way to home video through Spotlite Video in 1986. These also were all previously released on the catalogue Blackhawk releases and contained none of the ones that had been out of print. These were available through retail. Meanwhile, MGM released 20 of its 52 Our Gang shorts in a five-volume VHS set with four shorts per tape.

In 1991, Republic repackaged 30 Little Rascals shorts for a fifteen-volume VHS set, with two shorts per tape. Out of the 30 episodes released, only one of them (Night 'n' Gales) had been previously unreleased.

 Cabin Fever/Hallmark releases 
In 1993, Republic sold the home video rights to the 80 sound Roach shorts and some of the available silent shorts to Cabin Fever Entertainment. Cabin Fever also acquired the rights to use the original Our Gang title cards and MGM logos; for the first time in over 50 years, the Roach sound Our Gang comedies could be seen in their original format. In June 1994, Cabin Fever released a 12-volume set of Little Rascals VHS tapes, hosted by Leonard Maltin. With four shorts per tape, Cabin Fever made 48 Roach sound shorts available for purchase, uncut and with digitally restored and remastered picture and sound.

Due to the success of these volumes, Cabin Fever released nine more volumes in June 1995, which made the other 32 Roach talkies available for purchase (some of which had never been available on home video before). Five of these volumes contained four sound shorts, while the other four featured three sound shorts and a silent short.

Cabin Fever began pressing DVD versions of their first 12 Little Rascals VHS volumes (with the contents of two VHS volumes included on each DVD), but went out of business before the release was announced in late 1998. Early in 1999, they sold their catalog to Hallmark Entertainment.

In April 2000, Hallmark cleared out their warehouse, making all of the Little Rascals DVDs and VHS tapes available for retail, but never did an official launch of the Cabin Fever Little Rascals DVDs. In August, the first 10 volumes were re-released on VHS with new packaging, and the first two volumes were released on DVD as The Little Rascals: Volumes 1-2. In 2003, the VHS tapes went out of print. That spring, Hallmark issued a DVD called Little Rascals Vols. 3–4, which actually did not completely compile volumes three and four of the Cabin Fever VHS set, but included ten Our Gang shorts. On November 13, 2005, ten more Little Rascals shorts were issued on a DVD entitled Little Rascals Collectors Edition III.

 MGM/UA releases 
Throughout the early and mid 1990s, MGM/UA released a handful of the 1938-1944 MGM Our Gang shorts on VHS. The 1936 feature film General Spanky received both a VHS and LaserDisc release. Additionally, MGM/UA released a LaserDisc set of Our Gang comedies, consisting of both silent films and sound films.

 Later releases 
In 2006, Legend Films released colorized versions of twenty four Our Gang comedies, which were released across five Little Rascals DVDs. Twenty three of these shorts were Hal Roach talkies, while the remaining film is Waldo's Last Stand, a public domain short from the MGM era. These DVDs went out of print in 2009.

RHI Entertainment and Genius Products released an eight-disc DVD box set entitled The Little Rascals - the Complete Collection on October 28, 2008. This set includes all of the Hal Roach sound short films in the Our Gang series (1929–1938), encompassing all of the Our Gang shorts distributed to TV as The Little Rascals (save for a handful of silents). Sixty-four of the shorts are sourced from the Cabin Fever restorations, while the remaining sixteen shorts utilize older Blackhawk Films transfers without their original title cards. On June 14, 2011, Vivendi Entertainment re-released seven of the eight DVDs from the RHI/Genius box set (which encompasses all of the sound Roach Our Gang shorts and excludes the eight "special features" bonus disc), replacing the Blackhawk transfers with their respective Cabin Fever restorations.

Throughout the 2000s, Warner Home Video used individual MGM Our Gang shorts as supplemental features on DVD releases of entries in their classic film library. On September 1, 2009, Warner Bros. released the fifty two MGM Our Gang shorts in a compilation as part of their Warner Archive Collection mail-order series. The collection, Our Gang Comedies 1938–1942 (despite the title, includes the 1943 and 1944 MGM shorts as well), is available for DVD mail order through the Warner Bros. Studio Online Store, and for digital download through both the WB Studio Online Store and the Apple iTunes Store. On January 19, 2016, General Spanky was released on DVD through Warners.

 Public domain 
The following Our Gang comedies are in the public domain, and have appeared on many different VHS and DVD releases over the years.

 All pre-1928 comedies
 1928: Playin' Hookey 1930: Bear Shooters; School's Out
 1937: Our Gang Follies of 1938
 1940: Waldo's Last Stand

Notes

References 
 Maltin, Leonard & Bann, Richard W (1977, rev. 1992). The Little Rascals: The Life & Times of Our Gang. New York: Crown Publishing/Three Rivers Press. .

External links 
 Detailed series and crew filmographies on The Lucky Corner Our Gang website

 
Filmographies